Diceratobasis is a genus of damselfly in the family Coenagrionidae. The larva of species in this genus live in water that is trapped in bromeliads.

It contains the following species:
Diceratobasis macrogaster  - Jamaican Bromeliad Damsel
Diceratobasis melanogaster  - Hispaniolan Bromeliad Damsel

References

Coenagrionidae
Anisoptera genera
Taxonomy articles created by Polbot